Kina (stylized in all caps) is the debut studio album by American singer Kina. It was released on July 18, 2000, through DreamWorks Records.

Track listing

References 

2000 albums
Pop albums by American artists
Indie pop albums by American artists
Indie rock albums by American artists